The Missouri State League was a short–lived Class D level baseball minor league that played in the 1911 season. The league began play with five teams, all based in Missouri. The Missouri State League folded during the 1911 season.

History
The Missouri State League began the 1911 season as a five–team league with charter franchises based in Brookfield, Missouri, Jefferson City, Missouri, Kirksville, Missouri, Macon, Missouri, and Sedalia, Missouri. The Brookfield Hustlers folded on May 19, 1911 and the Sedalia Cubs moved to Brookfield after the Hustlers folded. On June 2, 1911, the Jefferson City Senators franchise folded. The Missouri State League permanently folded after play on June 4, 1911. The Sedalia/Brookfield Cubs finished in 1st place with a record of 11–8, compiling a 7–3 record based in Sedalia and 4–5 in Brookfield.

The league began play on May 11, 1911, before folding on June 5, 1911.

1911 cities represented 
Brookfield, MO: Brookfield Hustlers, Brookfield Cubs
Jefferson City, MO: Jefferson City Senators 
Kirksville, MO: Kirksville Osteopaths 
Macon, MO: Macon Athletics 
Sedalia, MO: Sedalia Cubs

1911 Standings and statistics 
Missouri State League standings schedule
 Brookfield Hustlers disbanded May 19. Sedalia (7–3) moved to Brookfield May 24. Jefferson City disbanded June 2League folded June 5.

References
Sumner, Benjamin Barrett.  Minor League Baseball Standings:All North American Leagues, Through 1999.  Jefferson, N.C.:McFarland. 

Sports leagues established in 1911
Defunct minor baseball leagues in the United States
Baseball leagues in Missouri
Sports leagues disestablished in 1911